Udhai Mazumdar (born March 28, 1970) is an Indian tabla player, music producer and composer.

Early life 
Mazumdar was born in Allahabad, and started learning tabla and Hindustani vocals at the age of seven. In 1981, he became a disciple of Kaviraj Ashutosh Bhattacharya.

In 1988, Mazumdar went to Delhi and became the disciple of the sitar maestro Ravi Shankar. He lived and learned with him in the age-old tradition of "Guru Shiyha Parampara" (Living with the teacher).

Career 
Mazumdar has performed for the Royal Families of Britain and Sweden. He has accompanied Ravi Shankar on occasions. Udai made his presence felt while performing with Zakir Hussain on the eve of the 75th birthday celebration of Ravi Shankar. Udai has broadcast on Radio DRS in Switzerland, BBC TV and Radio France. He has toured extensively across the globe: Durgalal Festival Delhi, The Saptak Festival Ahmedabad, Vasantahabba Festival Bengaluru, International Folk Festival Hungary, Drum Festival Germany, World Music Festival Rome, International Festival for Chernobyl Victims Minsk, festivals for contemporary music in Mongolia, Odessa, Vietnam, Indonesia, etc.

More recently he created a musical based on the 11th century epic Geet Govind by Jayadev, called Geet Govinda – The eternal love song of Krishna, Kabir Tulsi and Us, Singing Strings and Bhaskar - The Rising for which he has also composed and recorded the original music score.

Personal life

Mazumdar was born in a family of musicians. His father, Partho Sarathy Mazumdar, is among the first generation of guitarists in Indian classical music. Udhai is married to Filomena Bianculli. Together, they have one son, Jay Mazumdar and one daughter, Isha Mazumdar.

Mazumdar composes music and teaches students in Basel, Switzerland and New Delhi, India. Some of these performers include Namrrta Raai, Bhaskar Das, Rohan Dasgupta, Piu nandi, and Rupesh Pathak.

Discography

 Ibaadat - Love is Worship (2014)
 Bhaskar - The Rising (2013)
 Singing Strings" (2012) 
 Kabir Tulsi and Us (2011)
 Rising (2010) - Derek Gripper & Udhai Mazumdar
 Geet Govind (2009) 
 Echoes from India - Gaurav Mazumdar & Udhai Mazumdar
 Fulfilment - Shubhendra Rao & Udhai Mazumdar
 Walk on (Tatajan) 

 Reverberation – Kamala Bose & Udhai Mazumdar
 The Bamboo Flute in the Wind of Rhythm - Rakesh Chaurasia & Udhai Mazumdar
 Shabotinski Stenimals (1996)
 Journey - an elaborate Ragamala
 Shankar Ragamala 
 Musik der Welt Bern''

References

External links 
 
 CulturAll

1970 births
Indian male classical musicians
Tabla players
Living people
21st-century drummers
21st-century male musicians